Computer Shopper was  a magazine published monthly between 1988 and 2020 in the UK by Dennis Publishing Ltd. It contained reviews of home computers, consumer technology and software as well as technology-focused news, analysis and feature articles.

The final editorial staff include Madeline Bennett (editor), David Ludlow (contributing editor) and James Archer (reviews editor). Contributors of columns, features and specialist reviews include Mel Croucher, Kay Ewbank, Simon Handby, Ben Pitt and David Crookes.

Content
The first section of the magazine was dedicated to columns, opinions and the Letters pages. This was followed by several news spreads on recent developments in the technology industry.

The magazine claimed the "UK's biggest reviews section" with much of the magazine devoted to product tests of the latest hardware. The Reviews section was typically occupied by desktop PCs, laptops, PC components, smartphones, tablets, cameras, displays and printers. This section of new products was typically followed by two or three Group Tests which pitch ten or more similar products against one another to find an overall Best Buy. Previous tests have included budget laptops, cloud storage providers, action cameras and gaming PCs.

The Best Buys section of the magazine was updated monthly to reflect the latest products the editorial team has deemed the overall best choice(s) in each area of consumer technology.

Two or three longer-form feature articles follow the reviews section, focusing on the wider world of technology and its applications in various industries. Recent features have included a history of coding, a guide on how to build racing, flight and train simulators as well as more consumer-focused features on broadband and mobile coverage. A Retro section is also included.

The magazine was tailed by several tutorial pages including Advanced Projects, Multimedia Expert, Business Help and Helpfile.

The final page of the magazine is traditionally occupied by the Zygote column and the Great Moments in Computing comic.

See also 

 Computer Shopper (US magazine)

References

External links
 

1988 establishments in the United Kingdom
2020 disestablishments in the United Kingdom
2020 disestablishments in England
Amiga magazines
Computer magazines published in the United Kingdom
Defunct computer magazines published in the United Kingdom
Home computer magazines
Magazines established in 1988
Magazines published in London
Monthly magazines published in the United Kingdom